Ernst Stojaspal (14 January 1925 – 3 April 2002) was an Austrian professional footballer. He was born in Vienna. He was a forward or attacking midfielder noted for his prolific goalscoring record and technical ability.

Club career
A prolific striker, the left-footed Stojaspal played for Austria Wien for 10 years, winning three league titles and two domestic cups. Also, he topped the final goalscoring charts five times. After the 1954 World Cup, he moved abroad to play for Racing Strasbourg, AS Béziers, AS Monaco, Troyes AC and FC Metz in France. Stojaspal scored 481 goals in 413 games for Austria Wien and scored 674 goals in his career, both including friendlies.

In 2001, he was chosen in Austria's Team of the Century.

International career
Stojaspal made his debut for Austria in December 1946 against Italy and was a participant at the 1954 FIFA World Cup where he scored three goals in four matches. The third-place playoff against Uruguay proved to be his final international game. He earned 32 caps, scoring 15 goals. He was also part of Austria's squad for the football tournament at the 1948 Summer Olympics, but he did not play in any matches.

Retirement
Stojaspal later worked as a football coach and led some French clubs, most notable AC Ajaccio. He died in Moulins-lès-Metz, France.

Honours
Austrian Football Bundesliga: 1949, 1950, 1953
Austrian Cup: 1947, 1948
Austrian Bundesliga top goalscorer: 1946, 1947, 1948, 1952, 1953

References

External links
Player profile – Austria Archive
Bio – Racing Strasbourg

1925 births
2002 deaths
20th-century Austrian people
Austrian footballers
Austria international footballers
Olympic footballers of Austria
Footballers at the 1948 Summer Olympics
1954 FIFA World Cup players
FK Austria Wien players
RC Strasbourg Alsace players
AS Monaco FC players
ES Troyes AC players
FC Metz players
Austrian Football Bundesliga players
Ligue 1 players
Austrian expatriate footballers
Expatriate footballers in Monaco
Austrian expatriate sportspeople in Monaco
Expatriate footballers in France
Austrian expatriate sportspeople in France
Austrian football managers
AC Ajaccio managers
Footballers from Vienna
Association football forwards
AS Béziers Hérault (football) players
Expatriate football managers in France
Austrian expatriate football managers
Austrian military personnel of World War II